Groundbreaking, also known as cutting, sod-cutting, turning the first sod, or a sod-turning ceremony, is a traditional ceremony in many cultures that celebrates the first day of construction for a building or other project. Such ceremonies are often attended by dignitaries such as politicians and businesspeople.  

The actual shovel used during the groundbreaking is often a special ceremonial shovel, sometimes colored gold, meant to be saved for subsequent display and may be engraved. In other groundbreaking ceremonies, a bulldozer is used instead of a shovel to mark the first day of construction. In some groundbreaking ceremonies, the shovel and the bulldozer mark the first day of construction.

History 
Groundbreaking ceremonies have been celebrated for centuries in an attempt to begin the construction of a property, thanking those who made it possible. Though adapted to modern times, these ceremonies are still important to the construction industry. Early ceremonies were rooted in religion; by now, their basic foundations have still stood the test of time. 

Initially, some offerings/refreshments were also used to offer in such ceremonies, including; 

 Fruit
 Wine
 Grains
 Incense
 Beans 
 Tea leaves 
 Sacred items, like holy coins and relics.

Historical Groundbreaking Ceremonies 
The first documented groundbreaking ceremony took place in ancient China, in 113 BC. Later, the tradition of symbolically consecrating the project's location became a part of Hindu, Taoist, Shinto, Buddhist, and Feng Shui traditions.  
Historically, these are some notable events that were inaugurated by groundbreaking ceremonies. 

 The festival for the Washington Monument in 1848; was hosted by President James K. Polk. 
 The ceremony for the Parliament House in Melbourne, Australia in 1980; the event was held for Queen Elizabeth.
 The opening of LA Clippers stadium in Inglewood, CA; the ceremony was attended by the Mayor of the city, Jerry West, and Lawrence Frank.

Modern Approach to Groundbreaking Ceremonies 
The reason for holding groundbreaking ceremonies in today's modern world has nothing or little to do with religion. Today, the western world exercises this old-age practice with a different purpose. 

Today, the celebratory serves as a business activity for building interest in a new project/building. The ceremony generates positive press and regards those who are significant to the development and its overall scope. 

Usually, the project developer organizes groundbreaking ceremonies to attract clients and reflect positive impacts on the community, customers/clients, and employees.

Often such ceremonies also incorporate speeches by people of influence, like the founder of the company, a celebrity, or a known politician/member of the community. The sole purpose of such speeches is to showcase how a company is working, growing, meeting its mission, and/or reflecting on its vision, the company's struggles, and future plans.

To create a lasting impression of the company and the ceremony, some common supplies, including shovels, hardhats, etc., are given to participants/attendees.

Latest Trends in Groundbreaking Ceremonies 
Nowadays, real estate companies are trying different approaches to their groundbreaking ceremonies to stand out among their competitors and draw media attention. 

A Los Angeles developer Lowe Enterprises, hosted a “wall raising” in 1997 to draw attention to the start of their building project. Another developer from Santa Monica hosted a “bottoming out” party to mark the completion of their parking garage’s lowest level.

A Hollywood developer, TrizecHahn, practiced another unconventional ceremony. The company hosted a costly groundbreaking event for its $350-million Hollywood & Highland entertainment-retail project. The event was served by Music producer Quincy Jones and catered by the famed chef Wolfgang Puck.

Gallery

See also
Builders' rites
Topping out
Cornerstone
Publicity stunt
Ribbon cutting ceremony

References

External links

 

Ceremonies
Rituals attending construction